Future of the Past may refer to:

 Future of the Past (Destiny album), an album by Destiny
 Future of the Past (Vader album), a 1996 album by Vader
 In linguistics, futurity from a past perspective